Kunala (263 BC – ?) was the Crown Prince and son of 3rd Mauryan Emperor Ashoka The Great and Queen Padmavati and the presumptive heir to Ashoka, thus the heir to the Mauryan Empire which once ruled almost all of the Indian subcontinent. After the departure of Mahendra, Ashoka's eldest son, he was supposed to be the heir to the empire, but was blinded by his step-mother, Tishyaraksha, at a young age in jealousy. While he was not able to take the throne, his son, Samprati, became his heir.

Kunala also served as the Viceroy of Taxila during the reign of his father, having been appointed to the position in 235 BC.

Significance of name
Kunala also means "bird with beautiful eyes", "someone who sees beauty in everything" or "one with beautiful eyes".

Early life
At the age of eight, Ashoka sent his son to Ujjain, to be brought up and carry out his princely education, to become the heir to the throne of the Mauryan Empire.

Blinding
When the prince was eight years old, the king wrote (in Prakrit) to the tutors and mentioned the word:
Adheetaam - Meaning "He(Kunala) must study"(Context: Kunala should begin his studies).
 One of Ashoka's wives who wanted to secure the succession to her own son, being then present, took up the letter to read it. She secretly put a dot over the letter 'a', which changed the word to Andheetaam - Meaning "He(Kunala) must be blinded". Without rereading the letter, the king sealed and dispatched it. The clerk in Ujjayini was so shocked by the contents of this letter that he was unable to read it aloud to the prince. Kunala, therefore, seized the letter and read the cruel sentence of his father. Considering that as yet no Maurya prince had disobeyed the chief of the house, and unwilling to set a bad example, he stoutly put out his eyesight with a hot iron".

Alternatively, some stories explain that Kunala had been sent to Taxila to put down a rebellion, which he managed to do peacefully. But he was similarly blinded through the treacherousness of Ashoka's wife Tishyaraksha.

It is said by some scholars that the letter was sent to Kunal; not believing it, Kunal went to his father. This made King Ashoka angry, finding out that his wife had changed the letter, he sentenced her to death. Kunal then became heir to the throne of Mauryan Empire. It is uncertain whether this is true.

Attempts to claim throne
Years later Kunala came to Ashoka's court dressed as a minstrel accompanied by his favourite wife Kanchanmala. When he greatly pleased the king by his music, the king wanted to reward him. At this, the minstrel revealed himself as prince Kunala and demanded his inheritance. Ashoka sadly objected that being blind, Kunala never could ascend the throne. Thereupon the latter said that he claimed the kingdom not for himself but for his son. "When," cried the king, "has a son been born to you?" "Samprati" (meaning "Just now") was the answer. Samprati accordingly was the name given to Kunala's son, and though a baby, he was appointed Ashoka's successor. However, when Ashoka died, Samprati was too young to rule. Therefore, Ashoka was succeeded by another, older grandson, Dasharatha. After the demise of Dasharatha, Samprati did indeed become Emperor.

It is said that Prince Kunala established a kingdom in the Mithila region on the Indo-Nepal Border. It might be the same place where the present village, Kunauli (earlier known as Kunal Gram) at the bank of Kosi river on the Indo-Nepal Border is situated. There are some historical and archaeological evidences to support this claim.

Portrayal in popular media
A semi-fictionalized portrayal of Kunal's life was produced as a motion picture under the title Veer Kunal (1941). Ashok Kumar, a Tamil film was produced in 1941 based on the life of Kunal.

See also
 History of India
 Dhritarashtra

References

Blind royalty and nobility
People of the Maurya Empire
Heirs apparent who never acceded
Indian blind people
Ashoka
3rd-century BC Indian people
Mauryan dynasty